The Judo tournament at the Lusofonia Games was first held at the 2009 edition of the Lusofonia Games.

Winners

Men's tournament
-60 kg
 2009: 

-66 kg
 2009: 

-73 kg
 2009: 

-81 kg
 2009: 

-90 kg
 2009: 

-100 kg
 2009: 

+100 kg
 2009:

Women's tournament
-48 kg
 2009: 

-52 kg
 2009: 

-57 kg
 2009: 

-63 kg
 2009: 

-70 kg
 2009: 

-78 kg
 2009: 

+78 kg
 2009: 

 
Lusofonia Games
Lusophony Games
Judo